The International League of Peoples' Struggle (ILPS) is an international organization that seeks to coordinate anti-imperialist and democratic movements around the world. Communist Party of the Philippines founding chairman José María Sison organized the ILPS in 2001.

History 
The International League of Peoples' Struggle was established in May 2001 at Zutphen in the Netherlands, on the occasion of its First International Assembly, which drew participation from the representatives of mass organizations from 40 countries:

The International League of Peoples' Struggle had six International Assemblies since its establishment. The last one was held on 23–26 June 2019 in Hong Kong.

References

External links 

 
2001 establishments in the Netherlands
Civil rights organizations
Left-wing internationals
Organizations established in 2001
Progressivism
Supraorganizations
Socialist organizations
Zutphen
International Socialist Organisations